The Taiyuan Basin is located around the southern tail of the Hai'an Range in eastern Taiwan. The entire basin is located in the Dunghe Township of Taitung County. It is the traditional territory of the indigenous Amis. There is an archaeological site named Taiyuan site (泰源遺址) in the basin, which is a part of the Cilin Culture (麒麟文化).

References

Drainage basins of Taiwan
Landforms of Taitung County